Dayveon is a 2017 American drama film directed by Amman Abbasi and written by Amman Abbasi and Steven Reneau. The film stars Devin Blackmon, Dontrell Bright, Lachion Buckingham, Kordell Johnson, Marquell Manning and Chasity Moore. The film was released on September 13, 2017, by FilmRise.

Plot
Dayveon (Devin Blackmon) is a 13-year-old struggling to cope with the death of his brother. In the sweltering Arkansas heat, Dayveon roams the street and begins to spend time with a local gang. Although his sister's boyfriend reluctantly serves as a father figure and attempts to provide support and security, Dayveon is constantly drawn towards the violence and camaraderie of his new world.

Cast  
Devin Blackmon as Dayveon
Dontrell Bright as Brian
Lachion Buckingham as Mook
Kordell Johnson as Brayden
Marquell Manning as Country
Chasity Moore as Kim
Shavidee Trotter as Show D

Release
The film premiered at the 2017 Sundance Film Festival on January 19, 2017. On January 25, 2017, FilmRise acquired distribution rights to the film. The film was released on September 13, 2017, by FilmRise.

See also
List of black films of the 2010s
List of hood films

References

External links
 

2017 films
2017 drama films
American drama films
2010s English-language films
2010s American films